Guringay may refer to either of two Australian Aboriginal languages:
Guringai language (Kuringgai)
Gringai language (Gadhang/Kathang)